Božina M. Ivanović (31 December 1931 – 10 October 2002) was a Montenegrin anthropologist and politician. He served as General Secretary of the Montenegrin Academy of Sciences and Arts and President of Matica crnogorska. He was a professor at the Faculty of Science and Mathematics, University of Montenegro.

Early life and education 
Božina Ivanović was born on 31 December 1931 in Podgorica, where he graduated from elementary school, as well as lower and higher gymnasium. He graduated from the Higher Pedagogical School in Cetinje in 1952, studying in biology and chemistry. After that, Ivanović graduated in biology at the Faculty of Philosophy in Sarajevo in 1958. He received his doctorate in biology from the Faculty of Science in Sarajevo in 1964 and his doctorate in philosophy (in physical anthropology) from Charles University in Prague in 1974.

Political career 
Ivanović joined the Communist Party of Montenegro in 1949. He steadily moved up the ladder in the Montenegrin branch of League of Communists of Yugoslavia. Originally a teacher, Ivanović became Director of the Biological Institute in Titograd. From 1974 to 1982, he served as Education Secretary in SR Montenegro. He served as General Director of RTV Titograd.

From 1988 to 1989, he was the President of Presidency of SR Montenegro. He was forced out of power in January 1989 in the wake of the Anti-bureaucratic revolution.

Later life and death 
Following his fall from power, Ivanović became the first President of Matica crnogorska in May 1993. He was a professor at the Faculty of Science and Mathematics at the University of Montenegro.

Ivanović died on 10 October 2002 in Podgorica.

Selected works

References

1931 births
2002 deaths
Montenegrin anthropologists
Montenegrin communists
Montenegrin educators
League of Communists of Montenegro politicians
Presidents of Montenegro
20th-century anthropologists